USS Abeona was a mercantile stern wheel steamer that traded on the Mississippi between 1831 and her destruction by fire in 1872, except for two years, between 1863 and 1865, when she served the United States Navy as a gunboat.

Construction and commissioning
Abeona was built in 1831, at Pittsburgh, Pennsylvania, and the US Navy purchased her on 21 December 1864, at Cincinnati, Ohio. The navy converted her to a "tinclad" gunboat at Mound City, Illinois, and commissioned her there on 10 April 1865, (one day after the surrender of General Robert E. Lee).

Service history
Abeona performed patrol and guard duty on the Mississippi River, and its tributaries — primarily in the Mississippi River Squadron's 5th (the Mississippi, between Natchez and Vicksburg) and 10th (the Cumberland River and upper Ohio River) Districts. After all organized Confederate resistance ceased and the South had begun its painful and uncertain return to a peaceful way of life, Abeona was decommissioned at Mound City, 4 August 1865.

She was sold there on 11 August 1865, to J. A. Williamson, et al., and was registered under the same name on 17 October 1865. The veteran stern wheeler operated on the Mississippi, and its branches, until she caught fire at Cincinnati, 7 March 1872, and was destroyed.

As of 2004, no other ships in the United States Navy have borne this name.

References

Bibliography

 

American Civil War patrol vessels of the United States
Ships of the Union Navy
Gunboats of the United States Navy
Ships built in Pittsburgh
1831 ships
Ship fires
Shipwrecks of the Mississippi River
Maritime incidents in March 1872